ʿAlī ibn Maymūn ibn Abī Bakr al-Idrīsī al-Mag̲h̲ribī (1450–1511) (full name: Abu al-Hasan ʿAli ibn Maymūn ibn Abī Bakr ibn ʿAli ibn Maymūn al-Hashimi al-Qurashi al-Maghribi al-Ghumari al-Fasi Al-Maliki), also known as Shaykh 'Ali ibn Maymun, was a Moroccan ālim and Sufi mystic of Berber origin, but he pretended to be from an Alid origin, which increased his reputation.

Biography

Early life 
He was born in the region of Ghumara (north Morocco) around 1450, he studied Islamic sciences locally, then in Fez, from 1471. He held the office of qāḍī in Chefchaouen for a period of ten years (890–900). In his youth he is said to have been the amīr of the Banu Rashid tribe in the Jabal Ghumara, but to have relinquished that position because he was unable to enforce among his people the prohibition on wine-drinking.

Religious life 
In 901/1495-6 he left Fez, visited Damascus, Mecca, Aleppo, and Bursa, and finally settled at Damascus where he died in 917/1511.

Works 
His mysticism was of a moderate character; in his Bayān ghurbat al-Islām bi-wāsiṭat ṣinfayn min al-mutafaqqihah wa 'l-Mutafaqqirah min Ahl Miṣr wa 'l-Shām wa-mā yalīhumā min bilād al-a‘jām (Elucidation of the Abandonment of Islam on the Part of those who Claim to be Legal Scholars and those who Claim to be Sufis, from among the People of Egypt and Syria and those Foreign Lands around them), he inveighed against the religious and social abuses which he had noticed in the east. He wrote this work at an advanced age (he commenced it on 19 Muharram 916).

References 

1450 births
1511 deaths
15th-century Moroccan people
16th-century Moroccan people
15th-century Berber people
16th-century Berber people